Steven Andrew Ritchie (born 17 September 1980) is an English singer and reality television star known for his appearances on The X Factor and Celebrity Big Brother.

Career

2014: The X Factor

In 2014, Ritchie auditioned for eleventh series of The X Factor, singing "Dance with Me Tonight". Mentored by Simon Cowell, he was not initially selected for the live shows, but Cheryl Fernandez-Versini chose him to be the Over 26s wildcard. After the eliminations of Overload Generation in week 1 and Jack Walton and Lola Saunders in week 4, Ritchie was the last wildcard left in the competition. In week 6, Ritchie was in the bottom two with fellow Over 26s contestant Jay James. Cowell and Louis Walsh voted to send Ritchie home, but Mel B and Fernandez-Versini who chose him as a wildcard act and had the casting  vote, voted to send James home. This meant Fernandez-Versini sent the vote to deadlock and James was eliminated. The following week, he was in the bottom two again with Andrea Faustini and was eliminated by the judges with only Cowell voting to send Ritchie through to the quarter-final, and Mel B, Fernandez-Versini and Walsh voting to send Faustini through to the quarter-final, and he was eliminated, finishing in 6th place. However, voting statistics revealed that Ritchie received more votes than Faustini which meant that if Walsh sent the result to deadlock, Ritchie would have advanced to the quarter-final and Faustini would have been eliminated.

Performances during the show

2015: Celebrity Big Brother

Ritchie participated in the sixteenth series of Celebrity Big Brother with fiance, Chloe Jasmine Whichello. On 24 September, they reached the final on Day 29 and placed 5th.

Other appearances
In August 2015, Ritchie and Whichello appeared in an episode of Keep It in the Family. He also appeared in a celebrity edition of Channel 4 game show Benchmark in October 2015. He has made appearances on Good Morning Britain, Lorraine, This Morning and Loose Women. He has also taken part in the CBBC game show Ultimate Brain. On 15 August 2016 Essex County Standard reported that Essex TV had commissioned a show hosted by Ritchie dubbed 'Stevi Ritchie Takes On Essex.'

Stevi often performs with Park Resorts Holiday Parks at their Cambersands Beach location.

Stevi recently made a guest appearance at the ChrichMelex 2016 Awards Ceremony, joined by other X Factor Finalists from past seasons.

On Saturday 4 November 2017 Stevi performed alongside Britain’s Got Talent star Paul Manners at Bridgwater Carnival.

Personal life
Ritchie and fellow contestant Chloe Jasmine Whichello began dating during their participation on The X Factor, and announced their engagement on 12 July 2015. Ritchie has a daughter, Summer, from a previous relationship.

In 2007, Ritchie trained as professional wrestler, having a few professional matches using the name "Steve Straight".

References

1980 births
Living people
Game show contestants
The X Factor (British TV series) contestants
People from Colchester